Bicentennial Highway may refer to:

 Nova Scotia Highway 102
 Alberta Highway 88
 Utah State Route 95